Ong Boon Piow (Pha̍k-fa-sṳ: Vòng Vùn-phiâu) is a Malaysian politician who has served as  Member of the Perak State Legislative Assembly (MLA) for Tebing Tinggi from March 2008 to May 2018 and for Bercham since May 2018. He is a member of the Democratic Action Party (DAP), a component party of presently Pakatan Harapan (PH) and formerly Pakatan Rakyat (PR) opposition coalitions.

Early career 
He is also an insurance agent and a design engineer. He is a Bachelor of Mechanical Engineering from University of Putra Malaysia.

Politics 
He had joined DAP in 2005.

Election results

See also 

 Tebing Tinggi (state constituency)
 Bercham (state constituency)

Reference 

Democratic Action Party (Malaysia) politicians
Members of the Perak State Legislative Assembly
Malaysian people of Chinese descent
Living people
1979 births